Jonathan Brison (born 7 February 1983) is a French former professional footballer who played as a left-back.

Career
Brison was born in Soissons, Aisne. A Nancy player since his youth, he got his debut in Ligue 2 in September 2002 in the 3–1 defeat to Clermont Foot. Although it was never his preferred position, he played as left-back after breaking into the Nancy first-team.  

As a wide midfielder, Brison played most of Nancy's games since establishing himself as a fixture in the team in the 2003–04 season. The following year he was singled out for particular praise for his performances in the promotion-winning team.

In January 2012 he joined AS Saint-Étienne on a three-year contract.

In June 2016, he signed a three-year contract with Chamois Niortais. He left the club by mutual consent on 6 August 2018.

Career statistics

Honours
Nancy
Ligue 2: 2004–05
Coupe de la Ligue: 2005–06

Saint-Étienne
Coupe de la Ligue: 2012–13

References

External links
 

1983 births
Living people
People from Soissons
French footballers
Association football defenders
AS Nancy Lorraine players
AS Saint-Étienne players
Chamois Niortais F.C. players
Ligue 1 players
Ligue 2 players
Sportspeople from Aisne
Footballers from Hauts-de-France